Universidad Católica, Spanish for "Catholic university", may refer to:

Argentina
 Universidad Católica Argentina, in Buenos Aires
 Universidad Católica de Córdoba, in Córdoba

Bolivia
 Universidad Católica Boliviana, La Paz

Chile
 Universidad Católica de Chile, in Santiago
 Universidad Católica de Valparaíso, in Valparaíso
 Universidad Católica del Maule, in Talca
 Universidad Católica del Norte, in Antofagasta
 Universidad Católica de Temuco, in Temuco
 Universidad Católica de la Santísima Concepción

Colombia
 Catholic University, Bogota
 Universidad Católica de Oriente, Rionegro

Costa Rica
 , in San José

Cuba
 Universidad Católica de Santo Tomás de Villanueva, in Havana

Dominican Republic
 Pontificia Universidad Católica Madre y Maestra, in Santiago de los Caballeros
 Universidad Católica Santo Domingo, in Santo Domingo

Ecuador
 Pontificia Universidad Católica del Ecuador, in Quito
 Universidad Católica de Santiago de Guayaquil, Guayaquil

Honduras
 Universidad Católica de Honduras, in Tegucigalpa

Nicaragua
 Catholic University Redemptoris Mater, Managua

Panama
 Universidad Católica Santa María La Antigua, Panama City

Paraguay
 Universidad Católica Nuestra Señora de la Asunción, in Asunción

Peru
 Pontificia Universidad Católica del Perú, in Lima
 Universidad Católica Sedes Sapientiae, in Lima
 Universidad Católica de Santa María, in Arequipa
 Universidad Católica de San Pablo, in Arequipa

Spain
 Universidad Católica San Antonio de Murcia, in Murcia

Uruguay
 Universidad Católica del Uruguay Dámaso Antonio Larrañaga, in Montevideo

Venezuela
 Universidad Católica Andrés Bello, with its main campus in Caracas

See also
 Catholic university